Clear Lake (Dakota: mdéza; "Clear") is a city in and the county seat of Deuel County, South Dakota, United States. The population was 1,218 at the 2020 census.

History
The city was named after the local Clear Lake.

Geography
Clear Lake is located at  (44.755248, -96.684950).

Clear Lake has been assigned the ZIP code 57226 and the FIPS place code 12540.

Demographics

2010 census
As of the census of 2010, there were 1,273 people, 552 households, and 338 families living in the city. The racial makeup of the city was 97.6% White, 0.4% African American, 0.1% Asian, 0.4% from other races, and 1.5% from two or more races. Hispanic or Latino of any race were 1.0% of the population.

There were 552 households, of which 27.4% had children under the age of 18 living with them, 49.5% were married couples living together, 8.2% had a female householder with no husband present, 3.6% had a male householder with no wife present, and 38.8% were non-families. 35.7% of all households were made up of individuals, and 18.5% had someone living alone who was 65 years of age or older. The average household size was 2.22 and the average family size was 2.85.

The median age in the city was 44.3 years. 21.7% of residents were under the age of 18; 7% were between the ages of 18 and 24; 22.3% were from 25 to 44; 25% were from 45 to 64; and 23.9% were 65 years of age or older. The gender makeup of the city was 48.8% male and 51.2% female.

2000 census
As of the census of 2000, there were 1,335 people, 565 households, and 354 families living in the city. The population density was 441.4 people per square mile (170.7/km2). There were 607 housing units at an average density of 200.7 per square mile (77.6/km2). The racial makeup of the city was 99.03% White, 0.15% Native American, 0.30% Asian, and 0.52% from two or more races. Hispanic or Latino of any race were 0.15% of the population.

There were 565 households, out of which 27.4% had children under the age of 18 living with them, 54.3% were married couples living together, 6.7% had a female householder with no husband present, and 37.2% were non-families. 33.8% of all households were made up of individuals, and 18.4% had someone living alone who was 65 years of age or older. The average household size was 2.24 and the average family size was 2.86.

In the city, the population was spread out, with 23.4% under the age of 18, 6.9% from 18 to 24, 23.1% from 25 to 44, 19.7% from 45 to 64, and 26.9% who were 65 years of age or older. The median age was 42 years. For every 100 females, there were 88.0 males. For every 100 females age 18 and over, there were 82.4 males.

As of 2000 the median income for a household in the city was $31,522 and the median income for a family was $40,859. Males had a median income of $27,250 versus $19,236 for females. The per capita income for the city was $15,755. About 3.4% of families and 9.2% of the population were below the poverty line, including 3.7% of those under age 18 and 21.7% of those age 65 or over.

Community activities
Clear Lake is host to one of the largest rodeos in the area. The Crystal Springs Ranch Rodeo  is held the end of June each year, drawing thousands of people to the town. It is held in the nation's most natural rodeo bowl in the Coteau Hills, a native grassland prairie formed by glaciers. During the rodeo, visitors and residents alike enjoy camping, community garage and yard sales, and a parade.

Notable people
 Gregory J. Stoltenburg, presiding judge of Third Judicial Circuit of South Dakota.

See also
 List of cities in South Dakota

References

External links

 

Cities in South Dakota
Cities in Deuel County, South Dakota
County seats in South Dakota